St Helen's Church, Stonegate, York is a Grade II* listed parish church in the Church of England in York.

History
The church dates from the 14th century. It was declared redundant in 1551 and partially demolished, but survived and was later brought back into use.

It was reconstructed between 1857 and 1858 by W H Dykes and reopened on 16 September 1858 The north, south and east walls were taken down and rebuilt. The church roof was replaced. Pews were replaced with open seating. Gas lighting was installed with standard gaseliers of polished brass and iron. The chancel was fitted with a gas corona with 24 lights.  

The tower was rebuilt between 1875 and 1876 by W Atkinson of York.

Parish status
The church is in a joint parish with St Martin le Grand, York.

Memorials
John Stow (d. 1775)
William Brooke (d. 1789)
Ann Acaster (d. 1834)
Thomas Hartley (d. 1808)
James Atkinson (d. 1839)
Ann Atkinson (d. 1840)
Barbara Davyes (d. 1765)
Elizabeth Davyes (d. 1767)
Tobias Conyars (d. 1868)
Elizabeth Acklam (d. 1722)

Organ

The pipe organ was built by J. W. Walker & Sons Ltd and dates from 1959.  A specification of the organ can be found on the National Pipe Organ Register.

References

Helen, Stonegate
Helen
Rebuilt churches in the United Kingdom
19th-century Church of England church buildings
St Helen's Square